Karlweis is a surname. Notable people with the surname include: 

Carl Karlweis (1850–1901), Austrian dramatist and short story writer
Oskar Karlweis (1894–1956), Austrian-American actor